The 2016 Bilderberg Conference took place between 9-12 June 2016 at the Taschenbergpalais grand hotel in Dresden, Germany.

Agenda
A list of key topics for discussion at the 2016 Bilderberg conference was published on the Bilderberg website shortly before the meeting. Topics for discussion included:

Current events
China
Europe: European migrant crisis, growth, reform, vision, unity
Middle East
Russia
US political landscape, economy: growth, debt, reform
Cyber security
Geopolitics of energy and commodity prices
Precariat and middle class
Technological innovation

Delegates (alphabetical)
A list of expected delegates was published by the Bilderberg Group.

Chairman: Henri de Castries

Ahmed Aboutaleb
Paul Achleitner
Marcus Agius
Maria Luís Albuquerque
César Alierta
Roger Altman
Sam Altman
Magdalena Andersson
Anne Applebaum
Patricia Barbizet
José Manuel Barroso
Yoshua Bengio
René Benko
Franco Bernabè
Ben van Beurden
Olivier Blanchard
Ana Patricia Botín
Philip M. Breedlove
Børge Brende
William J. Burns
Juan Luís Cebrián
Emmanuelle Charpentier
Benoît Cœuré
Claudio Costamagna
David M. Cote
John Cryan
Sharon Dijksma
Mathias Döpfner
John Elkann
Tom Enders
Richard Engel
Laurent Fabius
Roger W. Ferguson Jr.
Niall Ferguson
Douglas Flint
Kristalina Georgieva
Helen Goodman
Sylvie Goulard
Lindsey Graham
Lilli Gruber
Chris Hadfield
Victor Halberstadt
Dido Harding
Demis Hassabis
Mellody Hobson
Reid Hoffman
Timotheus Höttges
Kenneth M. Jacobs
James A. Johnson
Vernon Jordan
Joe Kaeser
Alex Karp
Henry Kissinger
Klaus Kleinfeld
Henry Kravis
Marie-Josée Kravis
André Kudelski
Christine Lagarde
Rick Levin
Ursula von der Leyen
Thomas Leysen
George Logothetis
Thomas de Maizière
Christa Markwalder
Megan McArdle
Charles Michel
John Micklethwait
Zanny Minton Beddoes
Kyriakos Mitsotakis
Bill Morneau
Craig Mundie
Charles Murray
Willem-Alexander of the Netherlands
Michael Noonan
Peggy Noonan
Michael O'Leary
Kajsa Ollongren
David Petraeus
Søren Pind
Carlo Ratti
Heather Reisman
Mark Rutte
John Sawers
Wolfgang Schäuble
Eric Schmidt
Klaus Schwab
Radosław Sikorski
Mehmet Şimşek
Hans-Werner Sinn
Kristin Skogen Lund
Guy Standing
Carl-Henric Svanberg
Peter Thiel
Stanislaw Tillich
Martin Vetterli
Björn Wahlroos
Jacob Wallenberg
Beatrice Weder di Mauro
Martin Wolf

See also
List of Bilderberg meetings

References

External links

2016 conferences
2016 in Germany
2016 in international relations
2016
Dresden
June 2016 events in Europe